The 1998 Camden Borough Council election took place on 7 May 1998 to elect members of Camden London Borough Council in London, England. The whole council was up for election and the Labour Party stayed in overall control of the council.

Campaign
Issues in the election included a recent 10% council tax rise which was the highest in London, service improvements, claims that a partnership with the police had cut crime and a strike in local libraries.

Election result
Overall turnout in the election was 33.4%. At the same as the election Camden saw 81.18% vote in favour of the 1998 Greater London Authority referendum and 18.82% against, on a 32.84% turnout.

Ward results

Adelaide

Belsize

Bloomsbury

Brunswick

Camden

Caversham

Castlehaven

Chalk Farm

Fitzjohns

Fortune Green

Frognal

Gospel Oak

Grafton

Hampstead Town

Highgate

Holborn

Kilburn

Kings Cross

Priory

Regents Park

St John's

St Pancras

Somers Town

South End

Swiss Cottage

West End

References

1998
1998 London Borough council elections